Pahladpur khalila is a village situated in Panipat tehsil of Panipat district in the Indian state of Haryana.

References 

Villages in Panipat district